The Townsend index is a measure of material deprivation within a population. It was first described by sociologist Peter Townsend in 1988.

The measure incorporates four variables:
Unemployment (as a percentage of those aged 16 and over who are economically active);
Non-car ownership (as a percentage of all households); 
Non-home ownership (as a percentage of all households); and
Household overcrowding.

These variables can be measured for the population of a given area and combined (via a series of calculations involving log transformations and standardisations) to give a “Townsend score” for that area.
A greater Townsend index score implies a greater degree of deprivation. Areas may be “ranked” according to their Townsend score as a means of expressing relative deprivation.

A Townsend score can be calculated for any area where information is available for the four index variables. Commonly, census data are used and scores are calculated at the level of census output areas. Scores for these areas may be linked or mapped to other geographical areas, such as postcodes, to make the scores more applicable in practice. The Townsend index has been the favoured deprivation measure among UK health authorities.

Researchers at the University of Bristol’s eponymous “Townsend Centre  for International  Poverty Research” continue to work on “meaningful measures of poverty”.

See also
 Scottish index of multiple deprivation (SIMD) 
 Oxford IMD-2000/2004 (ODPM)

References

Measurements and definitions of poverty